Senek is a village in the Pülümür District, Tunceli Province, Turkey. The village is populated by Kurds of the Balaban tribe and had a population of 37 in 2021.

The hamlets of Doğancık and Kahraman are attached to the village.

References 

Kurdish settlements in Tunceli Province
Villages in Pülümür District